Paddy Dixon (1923 - 20 August 2007) was an Irish Gaelic footballer who played as a centre-back at senior level for the Meath county team.

Dixon became a regular member of the Meath senior team during the 1949 championship. He went on to play a key role during a golden age for Meath, and won one All-Ireland medal, one Leinster medal and one National League medals. He was an All-Ireland runner-up on one occasion.

Honours

Meath
All-Ireland Senior Football Championship (1): 1949
Leinster Senior Football Championship (1): 1949
National Football League (1): 1950-51

References

1923 births
2007 deaths
Ballivor Gaelic footballers
Gaelic football backs
Meath inter-county Gaelic footballers
Winners of one All-Ireland medal (Gaelic football)